"The First Picture of You" is a song by English band the Lotus Eaters. It was released as the group's debut single in July 1983, and was included on their debut album No Sense of Sin released the following year.

Recording 
The song was first recorded during a John Peel Radio 1 session in 1982 and, when aired, stimulated a bidding war between major UK record labels. It took some time for the band to find the right producer, but they eventually teamed up with Nigel Gray, who had produced for the Police and Siouxsie and the Banshees. Recorded at Surrey Sound Studios in Leatherhead, the track features session bassist Alan Spenner, well known for his work with Joe Cocker and Roxy Music. Former bassist of the Cure and the Associates Michael Dempsey joined soon after and is featured on the rest of the band's debut album.

Coyle wrote the song during a cold winter during which he had no heating system.

Music video 
The music video was mainly filmed at a house in Ferry Road, Walberswick with additional scenes shot on Walberswick Beach.

Release 
"The First Picture of You" was a top 20 hit on the UK Singles Chart, peaking at number 15 in August 1983 after the band had twice appeared on BBC TV's Top of the Pops. The follow-up single, "You Don't Need Someone New", failed to reach the UK top 40, but this and subsequent songs were more successful for the band in France, Italy, Japan and the Philippines.

The song received more UK radio plays in 1983 than any other song.

Veteran DJ Peter Powell cites it as being his all-time favourite song.

The song was sampled by the Streets, forming the basis of the track "It's Too Late" on their 2002 album Original Pirate Material.

Charts

References 

1983 songs
1983 debut singles
Arista Records singles
British new wave songs